"This Heart" is a song written by Tim Mensy and Tony Haselden and recorded by American country music duo Sweethearts of the Rodeo.  It was released in January 1990 as the first single from the album Buffalo Zone.  The song reached number 25 on the Billboard Hot Country Singles & Tracks chart. In 1994, a version by Jon Randall was released as the second single for his debut album What You Don't Know.

Chart performance

Sweethearts of the Rodeo

Jon Randall

References

1990 singles
1990 songs
1994 singles
Jon Randall songs
Sweethearts of the Rodeo songs
Songs written by Tony Haselden
Songs written by Tim Menzies
Song recordings produced by Steve Buckingham (record producer)